Greenwich is the official state soil of Delaware.  According to the Natural Resources Conservation Service, "The Greenwich series consists of very deep, well-drained, moderately rapidly permeable soils that formed in sandy marine and old alluvial sediments overlain by a thin mantle of sediments that have a high content of silt."

See also
Pedology
Soil types
List of U.S. state soils

References

Pedology
Soil in the United States
Types of soil